The 1953 European Figure Skating Championships were held in Dortmund, West Germany from 22 to 25 January. Elite senior-level figure skaters from European ISU member nations competed for the title of European Champion in the disciplines of men's singles, ladies' singles, and pair skating.

Results

Men

Ladies

Pairs

References

External links
 results

European Figure Skating Championships, 1953
European Figure Skating Championships, 1953
European Figure Skating Championships
International figure skating competitions hosted by West Germany
European Figure Skating Championships, 1953
1950s in North Rhine-Westphalia
20th century in Dortmund
European Figure Skating Championships